WSHH (99.7 FM) is a commercial radio station in Pittsburgh, Pennsylvania. The station is the flagship of Renda Broadcasting and airs an adult contemporary radio format.  From mid-November through December 25, WSHH switches to all Christmas music.

WSHH has an effective radiated power (ERP) of 17,000 watts; its power is lower than some of its rivals because it broadcasts from a taller antenna, at 260 meters (853 ft) in height above average terrain (HAAT).  The transmitter is co-located with NBC network affiliate WPXI on Rising Main Avenue in Pittsburgh near Interstate 279.  The tower is in the Fineview neighborhood on Pittsburgh's North Side, with studios and offices located on Parish Street, also in Pittsburgh.

Programming
WSHH's current weekday on-air staff consists of Melanie Heinkel, Jordan Kline, Ron Antil, and the syndicated Delilah program. The station's weekend programming is automated with no live DJs.

History

WJAS-FM

On March 8, 1948, the station first signed on as WJAS-FM  It was the FM counterpart to WJAS, owned by the Pittsburgh Radio Supply House.

The two stations simulcast and were network affiliates of CBS Radio, airing its dramas, comedies, news, sports, soap operas, game shows and big band broadcasts during the "Golden Age of Radio."  As network programming moved from radio to television in the 1950s, WJAS-AM-FM carried a full service, middle of the road format of music, talk, news and sports.

On November 1, 1957 the National Broadcasting Company (NBC) gained control of WJAS and WJAS-FM, adding them to their roster of network owned-and-operated stations. Later that month the call letters were changed to WAMP and WFMP, which was derived from "AM and FM Pittsburgh". Three years later, both stations changed back to their original call letters.

Beautiful music WSHH
In the late 1960s, WJAS-FM ended its simulcast and began playing beautiful music, which continued into the 1970s and 1980s. In 1973, WJAS-AM-FM were sold to Heftel Broadcasting.   Heftel made some significant changes: WJAS switched to a talk format with the call sign WKTQ, while WJAS-FM became WSHH, using the moniker "Wish 100."

During the 1970s, beautiful music was well represented on Pittsburgh radio: WKJF, which later became WJOI, was the leader for many years, and KDKA-FM aired automated beautiful music during the day and classical music at night. (It became WPNT in 1979 with beautiful music (no more classical) and live announcers.)  Despite the competition, by the late 1970s, WSHH was Pittsburgh's number two station behind KDKA.  WSHH's ratings were helped by a full staff of live announcers, to add some personality and information, in addition to the instrumental music sweeps.

Nationwide acquisition
Nationwide Communications, a division of Nationwide Insurance, bought WKTQ and WSHH in 1975.  In 1982, Nationwide fired most of the WSHH staff, replacing them with an automated "live assist" format, to cut expenses. John Ford was the last live announcer before the switch.

During Wish's halcyon years, the station had only two announcers for the 24-hour broadcast day - program director and morning announcer Joe Fenn and afternoon announcer Tom Malloy.  Both men would work a live four-hour on-air shift, but their pre-recorded voices would be heard for another eight hours each day.

Renda ownership
Wish was sold in October 1983 to its current owner, Renda Broadcasting Corporation.  It was the first major market FM acquisition for company president Anthony F. Renda, who had also owned WIXZ (now WGBN) in suburban McKeesport during the 1970s. (Renda bought that station back in 1997.)  Renda also acquired WPXZ and WECZ in Punxsutawney three years prior to the acquisition of Wish 100.

While the ratings for WSHH remained high, its audience was aging, while advertisers usually prefer younger listeners.  The groundwork for a format change began in 1988, when Renda lured legendary Pittsburgh DJ Jack Bogut away from WTAE to do mornings.

Switch to adult contemporary
In 1989, Renda Broadcasting decided to challenge former easy listening WLTJ's position as Pittsburgh's soft adult contemporary at-work station by changing WSHH itself to Soft AC, on December 26, 1989.  The switch worked with WSHH becoming the Soft AC leader.
 
In 1997, WSHH moved from its longtime home on Crane Avenue in Green Tree to Parrish Street, just off Greentree Road and approximately a mile from the Crane Avenue building. This new building houses WSHH's studios and offices, as well as the corporate offices for Renda Broadcasting.

In 2009, WSHH saw its AC rival WLTJ move to a younger direction as a Hot AC station. By 2012, WSHH became Pittsburgh's last remaining AC, when suburban AC station WLER-FM in Butler, flipped to mainstream rock.

Christmas music
During the Christmas season, WSHH plays holiday-themed music. Delilah usually starts playing Christmas music in the evening first. Then the station plays Christmas music around the clock, beginning in mid-November. WSHH, like many other Christmas music stations, returns to regular programming on December 26. This competes with Classic Hits-formatted WWSW-FM, owned by iHeartMedia.

References

External links

SHH
Mainstream adult contemporary radio stations in the United States
Renda Broadcasting radio stations